"Evil" is a single by the band Earth, Wind & Fire which was issued in June 1973 by Columbia Records. The song peaked at No. 19 on the Billboard Easy Listening chart and No. 25 on the Hot Soul Singles chart.

Overview
Evil was produced by Joe Wissert and written by EWF bandleader Maurice White with Philip Bailey. The b-side of this single was a song called Clover. Both Evil and Clover came off the band's 1973 studio album, Head to the Sky.

Critical reception
Robert Christgau of the Village Voice described Evil as having a "catchy title" with "sweet clear harmonies and sinuous beat". Alex Henderson of Allmusic also called the tune "latin influenced".

Chart positions

Samples
"Evil" was sampled by Deee-Lite on the track Say Ahhh... off their 1994 album Dewdrops in the Garden and by Amerie feat. Carl Thomas on the track Can We Go off her 2005 album Touch.

References

1973 singles
Earth, Wind & Fire songs
Songs written by Maurice White
Songs written by Philip Bailey
1973 songs
Columbia Records singles